Portuguese supercentenarians are citizens, residents or emigrants from Portugal or its former colonies who have attained or surpassed 110 years of age. , the Gerontology Research Group (GRG) had validated the longevity claims of 9 Portuguese supercentenarians, including 7 residents and 2 emigrants. Maria de Jesus was the oldest Portuguese citizen whose age was validated; she lived 115 years and 114 days, from 1893 to 2009.

Oldest known Portuguese people

Biographies

Maria do Couto Maia-Lopes 
Maria do Couto Maia-Lopes (24 October 1890 – 25 July 2005) is the 2nd longest-lived person to be documented in Portugal. She was born and lived in Grijó, in Vila Nova de Gaia, which is near the city of Porto.

She remembered the day when the last king of Portugal, D. Manuel II, visited the nearby town of Espinho, on 23 November 1908.

She had a total of eight daughters, seven grandchildren, ten great-grandchildren and five great-great-grandchildren. Her husband died in 1942. One of her great-granddaughters married a grandson of Portugal's oldest ever man, Augusto Moreira de Oliveira (1896 – 2009).  Maia-Lopes died on 25 July 2005, aged 114 years 274 days.

Alice Sanders 
Alice Sanders (São Jorge Island, 12 May 1897 – Merced, California, 7 November 2007) was one of the last survivors of the 1906 San Francisco earthquake. Alice Catarina Matos was born in the Azores archipelago. Her family emigrated to Half Moon Bay (California) in 1903, when Alice was 6 years old. The April 18, 1906 San Francisco earthquake, a few weeks prior to Alice's ninth birthday, was a traumatic experience to her family, since they believed the end of the world had come. In 1912, the Matos family moved to Gustine, where  Alice met Clarence Leonard Sanders, who became her husband on Christmas Day in 1913.

References 

Portuguese
Supercentenarians